In the mid-20th century, some Americans traveled to Mexico to obtain a "Mexican divorce". A divorce in Mexico was easier, quicker, and less expensive than a divorce in most U.S. states, which then only allowed at-fault divorces requiring extensive proof and lengthy court review. Celebrities who obtained a Mexican divorce include Elizabeth Montgomery (from Gig Young), Johnny Carson, Katharine Hepburn, Richard Burton, Elizabeth Taylor (from Eddie Fisher), Marilyn Monroe (from Arthur Miller), Don Hewitt, Charlie Chaplin (from Paulette Goddard), Jayne Mansfield (from Mickey Hargitay), Stanley Kubrick, and Tom T. Chamales.

It was often referred to as a quickie (sometimes spelled quicky) Mexican divorce.

Historical context
Mexico does not require spouses to be present at a divorce hearing; they can send a lawyer to represent them. This "fast-track" process is in contrast to American divorce procedures, which involve additional bureaucracy and added expense.

A state in the United States is not required to recognize the validity of a Mexican divorce obtained by one of the state’s residents, because the Full Faith and Credit Clause of the United States Constitution does not apply to foreign judgments.  The State of New York is the only state that recognizes the validity of a Mexican divorce obtained by a New York resident, so long as the divorce is bilateral (i.e. both parties appeared in the proceeding).

In 1970, in accordance with a Mexican federal law recommendation, many courts stopped accepting divorce petitions from non-residents. Accordingly, petitioners must be selective in their choice of court.  With the advent of no-fault divorce in the United States, Mexican divorces are not as popular as they once were.

In popular culture
The Mexican divorce is mentioned in the Jack Kerouac book On the Road.

"Mexican Divorce" is the title of a 1961 song by Burt Bacharach and Bob Hilliard, which was issued as single in 1962 by The Drifters. It is also the song where Bacharach first met Dionne Warwick, one of the background singers, for whom he would later write numerous top hits. The song would be remade by Ry Cooder on his 1974 album Paradise and Lunch and by Nicolette Larson on her 1978 album Nicolette. Mexican divorce is also referenced in the song "What Do You Want from Life?" by The Tubes and in the Tom Waits song "The Part You Throw Away".

A reference to a Mexican quickie divorce is also made in the episode "Up in Barney's Room" of The Andy Griffith Show (season 4, episode 10). Mexican divorces were also plot twists in several episodes of the legal drama Perry Mason.

A Mexican divorce and a marriage are central to the plot of the 1965 movie Marriage on the Rocks. The Mexican Government was offended by the film's depiction of Mexico and banned the film and other Sinatra films for what they regarded as a derogatory depiction of the nation.

See also 
Divorce in the United States
Divorce mill

References

Divorce in the United States
Law of Mexico
Marriage, unions and partnerships in Mexico